Donald Ross Brooks (born October 17, 1937) is a Canadian former professional ice hockey goaltender who played three seasons with the Boston Bruins of the National Hockey League (NHL) between 1972 and 1975. His NHL debut at the age of 36 made him one of the oldest rookies in professional hockey history.

Playing career
Brooks had a long minor league career which included seven seasons for the Providence Reds of the American Hockey League (AHL), and shared the Harry "Hap" Holmes Memorial Award for lowest goals against average in the AHL with teammate Dan Bouchard in 1972. In the 1972–73 NHL season, the Bruins, who owned his rights, lost several goaltenders: top prospect Bouchard to expansion, star Gerry Cheevers to the World Hockey Association and veteran Eddie Johnston to a trade with the Toronto Maple Leafs. This opened the door for Brooks' recall as the backup goaltender. He excelled swiftly, matching a NHL record set by Bruins' goaltender Tiny Thompson in the 1920s for the longest consecutive winning streak by a goaltender, 14 games (since surpassed by Patrick Lalime).

Brooks played for the Bruins from 1972 until 1975, after which, upon the return of Cheevers to the organization, he played a single season for the Bruins' AHL Rochester Americans farm team before retiring. Playing for a powerhouse team that regularly finished around the top of the league standings, he compiled a career record of 37 wins, and only 7 losses and 6 ties with a goals against average of 2.63. His career winning percentage is one of the highest recorded for goalies with 50 or more decisions.

Post-playing career
After his retirement, Brooks was a longtime executive for the Bruins' farm team in Providence, leaving that post in 2000. He currently manages operations of Schneider Arena on the campus of Providence College.

Career statistics

Regular season and playoffs

See also
List of select Jewish ice hockey players

References

External links

1937 births
Living people
Barrie Flyers players
Boston Braves (AHL) players
Boston Bruins players
Canadian expatriate ice hockey players in the United States
Canadian ice hockey goaltenders
Jewish Canadian sportspeople
Jewish ice hockey players
Jersey Larks players
Johnstown Jets players
Long Island Ducks (ice hockey) players
Oklahoma City Blazers (1965–1977) players
Ontario Hockey Association Senior A League (1890–1979) players
Phoenix Roadrunners (WHL) players
Providence Reds players
Rochester Americans players
Ice hockey people from Toronto